Boysie Singh, (5 April 1908 – 20 August 1957) also referred to as John Boysie Singh and also as the Raja (the Hindi word for king), or just Boysie, was born on 5 April 1908 on 17 Luis Street, Woodbrook, Port of Spain, Saint George County, British Trinidad and Tobago to Bhagrang Singh (a fugitive who immigrated to British Trinidad and Tobago from British India) and his wife.

He had a long and successful career as a gangster and gambler before turning to piracy and murder. For almost ten years, from 1947 until 1956 he and his gang terrorized the waters between Trinidad and Tobago and Venezuela. They were responsible for the deaths of approximately 400 people. They would promise to ferry people from Trinidad to Venezuela but en route he would rob his victims at gunpoint, kill them and dump them into the sea. 

Boysie was well-known  in Trinidad and Tobago. He had successfully beaten a charge of breaking and entering which nearly resulted in his deportation before he was finally executed after losing his third case - for the murder of his niece. He was held in awe and dread by most of the population and was frequently seen strolling grandly about Port of Spain in the early 1950s wearing bright, stylish clothes. Mothers, nanis, and ajees would warn their children: "Behave yourself, man, or Boysie goyn get, allyuh!" Boysie Singh died in Port of Spain by being hanged in 1957 for the murder of a dancer, Hattie Werk.

References

1908 births
1957 deaths
20th-century executions by Trinidad and Tobago
Executed Trinidad and Tobago people
People convicted of murder by Trinidad and Tobago
People executed by Trinidad and Tobago by hanging
People executed for murder
Trinidad and Tobago criminals
Trinidad and Tobago people convicted of murder
Trinidad and Tobago people of Indian descent